Ram Krishna Yadav may refer to:
 Ram Krishna Yadav (Indian politician)
 Ram Krishna Yadav (Nepali politician)